Mixtape, Vol. 1 (also titled as Mixtape, Vol. 1: Hosted by DJ Dirty Rico) is a remix album released on April 17, 2012 by the Washington, D.C.-based go-go band Rare Essence. The album was compiled and remixed by DJ Dirty Rico. The follow-up album Mixtape, Vol. 2 was released on July 2, 2013.

Track listing

Personnel

Adapted from AllMusic

DJ Rico – compilation producer, DJ, mixing, vocals
Rare Essence – primary artist
Doug E. Fresh – guest artist
Kimberly "Ms. Kim" Graham – guest artist
Killa Cal – featured artist
Redman – guest artist
Dave "32" Ellis – guest artist

References

2012 compilation albums
2012 remix albums
Rare Essence albums